Crassispira callosa is a species of sea snail, a marine gastropod mollusk in the family Pseudomelatomidae.

Description
The length of the shell varies between 35 mm and 50 mm.

The chocolate-colored shell is very solid, with a well-defined shoulder, and sulcate space above it. The longitudinal ribs lare ow, rounded, closer than in Crassispira bottae. The interspaces are very narrow, crossed by raised revolving lines.

Distribution
This species occurs in the Atlantic Ocean from Senegal to Angola

References

 Bernard, P.A. (Ed.) (1984). Coquillages du Gabon [Shells of Gabon]. Pierre A. Bernard: Libreville, Gabon. 140, 75 plates pp.

External links
 
 

callosa
Gastropods described in 1840